The 2017 Copa Centroamericana was the 14th and last edition of the Copa Centroamericana, the biennial international men's football championship of the Central American region organized by the Central American Football Union (UNCAF). The tournament was hosted in Panama between 13–22 January 2017.

The top four teams qualified for the 2017 CONCACAF Gold Cup, while the fifth-placed team advanced to a play-off against the fifth-placed team from the 2017 Caribbean Cup for the final Gold Cup berth.

The tournament was played in round-robin format as a result of Guatemala not being able to participate due to FIFA's suspension of the National Football Federation of Guatemala.

Entrants
Six of the seven UNCAF members were eligible to participate in the tournament.

On 28 October 2016, FIFA suspended the National Football Federation of Guatemala for political interference by the Government of Guatemala. Until the suspension is lifted, Guatemalan teams are not permitted to participate in international competitions. CONCACAF had set the deadline of 9 December 2016 for the suspension to be lifted, otherwise by rule, Guatemala would be disqualified from the 2017 Copa Centroamericana, and any revision to the tournament format would be discussed once the deadline had passed. The suspension was not lifted before the deadline, so Guatemala could not participate in the competition.

Venue
All matches were played at Estadio Rommel Fernández in Panama City.

Original draw
The original format of the competition was to be a group stage (one group of four teams and one group of three teams) followed by a knockout stage (fifth-placed match, semi-finals, third-placed match and final). The draw for the competition with the original format took place on 25 October 2016, 18:00 UTC−5, at the Hotel Sortis in Panama City, Panama.

The original draw results were:

Group A

Group B

A change in format was announced on 10 December 2016 following FIFA's decision not to lift the suspension of the National Football Federation of Guatemala.

Squads

Each team squad had to have a minimum of 18 players and a maximum of 23 players, two of whom must be goalkeepers.

Standings

Matches
All times are EST (UTC−5).

Matchday 1

Matchday 2

Matchday 3

Matchday 4

Matchday 5

Goalscorers
3 goals
 Eddie Hernández

2 goals

 José Guillermo Ortiz
 Erick Andino
 Rubilio Castillo
 Bryan García

1 goal

 Deon McCaulay
 Elroy Smith
 Francisco Calvo
 Johan Venegas
 Juan Barahona
 Irvin Herrera
 Gerson Mayén
 Henry Romero
 Rodolfo Zelaya
 Juan Barrera
 Daniel Cadena
 Abdiel Arroyo
 Armando Cooper
 Roderick Miller
 Josiel Núñez

Own goals

 Henry Figueroa (playing against Nicaragua)

Awards
The following awards were given at the conclusion of the tournament:
Golden Ball:  Jorge Claros
Golden Boot:  Eddie Hernández (3 goals)
Golden Glove:  José Calderón
Young player award:  Roberto Domínguez
Fair play award:  Jhonny Acosta
Best XI:
Goalkeeper:  José Calderón
Left Defender:  Alexander Larín
Central Defender:  Harold Cummings
Central Defender:  Francisco Calvo
Right Defender:  Jairo Puerto
Left Midfielder:  Óscar Cerén
Central Midfielder:  Darwin Cerén
Central Midfielder:  Jorge Claros
Central Midfielder:  Armando Cooper
Left Midfielder:  Erick Andino
Forward:  Eddie Hernández

Qualified teams for CONCACAF Gold Cup
The following five teams qualified for the 2017 CONCACAF Gold Cup.

References

External links
Central American Cup, CONCACAF.com
Copa Centroamericana, UNCAFut.com 

 
2017 CONCACAF Gold Cup
2017 in Central American football
2017
International association football competitions hosted by Panama
2017 in Panamanian sport
January 2017 sports events in North America